David Barry Morgan (born 4 July 1994) is a Northern Irish professional footballer who plays as a midfielder for League One club Accrington Stanley.

Club career
Morgan joined Nottingham Forest aged fourteen from Northern Irish club Ards. He was scouted playing in the prestigious Milk Cup Youth Tournament. He played with the Forest youth team for four years, before making a 28-day loan move to Lincoln City on 14 September 2012. He made his debut on 15 September 2012 in a 3–2 victory over Hyde, where he entered the game as an 85th-minute substitute. Morgan joined Scottish Premier League club Dundee on 31 January 2013. He made one appearance, coming on as a substitute for Nicky Riley in a 5–0 defeat by Celtic. Morgan later joined Conference Premier club Tamworth on 25 October 2013.

After his release from Nottingham Forest, Morgan signed with Northern Premier League club Ilkeston on 13 August 2014. On 2 March 2017, Morgan joined AFC Fylde for an undisclosed five-figure sum.

On 9 September 2017 Morgan signed for Harrogate Town. It was then announced after only three appearances for Harrogate that he would sign for Southport on 22 September 2017.

On 1 February 2021, Morgan joined League One side Accrington Stanley for an undisclosed fee.

Personal life
Morgan graduated from Staffordshire University in 2016 with a first-class bachelor's degree in Professional Sports Writing and Broadcasting.

Career statistics

References

External links

1994 births
Living people
Association footballers from Northern Ireland
Northern Ireland youth international footballers
Northern Ireland under-21 international footballers
Nottingham Forest F.C. players
Lincoln City F.C. players
Dundee F.C. players
Tamworth F.C. players
Ilkeston F.C. players
Nuneaton Borough F.C. players
National League (English football) players
Scottish Premier League players
Alumni of Staffordshire University
AFC Fylde players
Harrogate Town A.F.C. players
Southport F.C. players
Accrington Stanley F.C. players
Association football midfielders